Isidor Sekseni (born 19 November 1986) is an Albanian footballer who currently plays as a midfielder for Italian lower league side US Castiglionese 1919. His main position is in the centre of midfield but he can play in more advanced roles as well.

Club career

Dinamo Tirana
Sekseni signed for the Albanian champions on 28 July 2010. He signed a two-year contract with the club keeping him in Tirana until 2012. He made his debut for Dinamo in a 2–1 win over Besa Kavajë on 28 August 2010. He started the game in the centre of the midfield with Igli Allmuca and played the full 90 minutes.

He later moved to Italy to play in the lower leagues, joining Castiglionese from Valdarno in December 2016.

Playing style
Isidor Sekseni preferred using both his feet. Sometimes, you will be able to see him using his left foot the strike, and other times he will be using his right foot to strike.

References

External links
 Profiile - FSHF
 
 

1986 births
Living people
People from Mirditë
Association football midfielders
Albanian footballers
Albania youth international footballers
KF Skrapari players
KS Lushnja players
KS Shkumbini Peqin players
FK Dinamo Tirana players
KS Kastrioti players
Scandicci Calcio players
Kategoria Superiore players
Kategoria e Parë players
Albanian expatriate footballers
Expatriate footballers in Italy
Albanian expatriate sportspeople in Italy